Sandín is a Spanish village of the municipality of Manzanal de Arriba, located in the north of the province of Zamora, in the autonomous community of  Castile and León. It has 35 inhabitants (as of 2012) and an altitude of 716 meters.

Overview
It is a small village linking it to the municipality of Manzanal de Arriba, located in the natural zone of the Sierra de la Culebra. Town whose low zone underwent the flood caused by the dam of Cernadilla and that took to its inhabitants to the construction of new houses, in the same way that a new parochial temple. Very near next to it is where it meets Portugal.

The village is 65 km to Zamora and 260 km to Madrid.

Demographics

See also
Benavente
San Pedro de Zamudia
List of municipalities in Zamora

References

External links
 Sandin on todopueblos.com

Populated places in the Province of Zamora